This is a dynamic list of Native Americans who are or were judges, magistrate judges, court commissioners, administrative law judges or tribal court judges. If known, it will be listed if a judge has served on multiple courts and their tribal membership.

Other topics of interest

List of African-American jurists
List of Asian American jurists
List of Hispanic/Latino American jurists
List of Jewish American jurists
List of LGBT jurists in the United States
List of first women lawyers and judges in the United States
List of first minority male lawyers and judges in the United States

References

Native American judges
jurists
Lists of legal professionals
American jurists